Cylindropuntia fosbergii is a species of cactus known by the common names Hoffmann's teddybear cholla, pink teddy-bear cholla, and Mason Valley cholla. It is endemic to south-eastern California where its range is restricted to the flats and hillsides of a very limited area in the region of Anza-Borrego Desert State Park in the western Sonoran Desert.

Description 
Cylindropuntia fosbergii grows to over seven feet in height and is distinguished by a pinkish tinge to its spines.

References

fosbergii
Cacti of the United States
Flora of the Sonoran Deserts
Flora of the California desert regions